North Salem is an unincorporated community in Guernsey County, in the U.S. state of Ohio.

History
A post office was established at North Salem in 1854, and remained in operation until 1906. The name is a bit of a misnomer, as North Salem is actually south of Salem, Ohio.

References

Unincorporated communities in Guernsey County, Ohio
Unincorporated communities in Ohio